Jerome S. Rizzo (March 12, 1918 – August 27, 2011) was an American professional basketball player. He played for the Syracuse Nationals in the National Basketball League and averaged 8.4 points per game. In February 1949 he got suspended by the NBL for hitting a referee.

After his professional basketball career ended, Rizzo moved to Las Vegas, Nevada and opened a sporting goods store.

References

1918 births
2011 deaths
American Basketball League (1925–1955) players
American men's basketball players
American military personnel of World War II
Basketball players from Nevada
Basketball players from New York City
Fordham Rams men's basketball players
Guards (basketball)
Player-coaches
Paterson Crescents players
People from Astoria, Queens
Sportspeople from Las Vegas
Sportspeople from Queens, New York
Syracuse Nationals players